Arne Lyngstad (10 May 1962 - 30 May 2019) was a Norwegian politician for the Christian Democratic Party.

Lyngstad was born in Verdal.  He was elected to the Norwegian Parliament from Nord-Trøndelag in 1997, and was re-elected on one occasion.

Lyngstad was a deputy member of Verdal municipality council in 1983–1987, of Nord-Trøndelag county council in 1987–1991 and of Trondheim city council in 1991–1995.

References

1962 births
2019 deaths
Christian Democratic Party (Norway) politicians
Members of the Storting
21st-century Norwegian politicians
20th-century Norwegian politicians
People from Verdal